Iriarteeae is a palm tribe in the subfamily Arecoideae.

Genera
Iriarteeae includes the following genera:
Dictyocaryum
Iriartea
Iriartella
Socratea
Wettinia

See also
 List of Arecaceae genera

References

External links

 
Monocot tribes
Taxa named by Carl Georg Oscar Drude